Adrianne Frost (born October 16, 1978) is an American comedian, author, and actress. She is best known for her work on Comedy Central's The Daily Show and VH1's Best Week Ever.

She was born in Lincoln, Nebraska. but grew up in  Louisiana. She attended the University of Southwestern Louisiana.

In 2002, she became a correspondent on The Daily Show, but left the show later that year.  In 2004, she became a panelist on Best Week Ever, and stayed until 2007. In 2006, she published her first book I Hate Other People's Kids.   She was published in the "Signet Book of American Humor" in 2004 and in "[Rejected: Tales of The Failed Dumped and Canceled]" in 2009.  Her comic writing can be found on https://www.mcsweeneys.net/, https://crookedmarquee.com/, http://www.shebytches.com, http://www.askejean.com, and more.

She has appeared on Nurse Jackie, Law & Order, Law and Order: Criminal Intent, Law and Order: SVU, 30 Rock, and Late Night with Conan O'Brien.  Adrianne made her feature film debut in Ticking Clock with Cuba Gooding, Jr. and Neil McDonough.  She was featured in "Bert and Arnie's Guide To Friendship", released in 2012,"Lovehunter", released in 2013, and "After Everything" in 2018. Most recently, she was on CBS's "Bull" (Episode 17, "Name Game").

She has also been featured in over a dozen nationally syndicated commercials.

Currently, Adrianne performs in Gong Show Live, playing drunken D-list actress Rhonda Smith Duffy Chorus.  She is also a 7 time champion of the Manhattan Monologue Slam and was the Grand National Champion for 2010.   She has appeared on the NY stage performing improvisation, stand up and storytelling at such venues as Tribeca Y, the UCB Theatre, Caroline's Comedy Club, Gotham Comedy Club, The People's Improv Theatre, The Magnet and various other venues around the city.  Outside of NY, she has performed at the Chicago Improv Festival, Orlando's Foolfest, the Funny Women's Festival, Portland and Toronto Improv Festivals and at London's Pleasance Theatre.

References

External links

1972 births
Living people
Comedians from Nebraska
American satirists
University of Louisiana at Lafayette alumni
Writers from Lincoln, Nebraska
American women comedians
Actors from Lincoln, Nebraska
21st-century American comedians
Women satirists
21st-century American women